GameTV is a Canadian English language specialty channel owned by Anthem Sports & Entertainment. It currently broadcasts a mixture of game shows, reality competition series, and films.

The channel was first launched in 2005 under the ownership of Stuart Media Group as Casino and Gaming Television (CGTV), which primarily focused on sports betting and televised poker. Larry Tanenbaum's Insight Sports served as the channel's operating partner. In 2007, the channel was re-launched under its current name, expanding its format to include competition programming (such as game and reality shows, and for a period, reruns of classic Canadian game shows) and films, and eventually phased out its gaming programming. 

In 2016, the channel was acquired by Anthem, after which it briefly expanded to include occasional sports and sports entertainment programming. Sports programming would later be dropped and shifted to new sister channel Game+, returning GameTV to its existing format.

History

In September 2001, Stuart Media Group was granted approval by the Canadian Radio-television and Telecommunications Commission (CRTC) to launch The Gaming Channel, described as "a national, English-language Category 2 specialty television service, providing live-event interactive programming about gaming or involving gaming. The service will offer programming including shorts and Canadian original programs about gaming that will be knowledge-based and entertaining, with a focus on providing unique insights into daily events of the gaming world and its participants. The service will also allow viewers to play along with Bingo Games, and will provide experimental, interactive and informational programming on gaming odds, lotteries, and the gaming experience in general."

In December 2004, Stuart Media Group announced that it had reached an agreement with Casino and Gaming Television, Inc., owners of the Casino and Gaming Television (CGTV) brand, which would see Stuart Media Group launch The Gaming Channel as a Canadian version of the yet-to-be-launched American television channel of the same name. The agreement would see the Canadian channel launch in May 2005 on Bell ExpressVu and act as, what the companies called, a "test bed" for the American channel which would also launch later in 2005.

The channel would later launch in November 2005 as Casino and Gaming Television (CGTV) Canada on Rogers Cable instead of initially on Bell ExpressVu. Programming on the channel primarily focused on poker, including live and pre-taped tournaments; however, programming on other casino games and casino-related programming did occur.

Upon the launch of the channel in 2005, CGTV Canada was owned by Stuart Media Group, who in turn was owned by a variety of investors, although was ultimately majority owned by what is now called Kilmer Group. The channel was however operated by Insight Sports, of which Kilmer Group was an investor in as well. The channel would go through several corporate reorganizations throughout its history but Kilmer Group would remain majority owner until it sold its interest in the channel in 2016.

On October 26, 2007 at 6:00 p.m. EST, CGTV was renamed GameTV to broaden its appeal to a larger audience by focusing on game-related programming including game shows, reality programming, poker and non-sports gaming, and feature films.

In October 2012, GameTV debuted a new logo and branding, and dropped its casino programming in favor of focusing specifically on game shows, competition-style reality series, and nightly feature films.

On August 2, 2016, Anthem Sports & Entertainment announced that it would acquire GameTV pending CRTC approval. The CRTC approved the purchase in November 2016.

With the acquisition of GameTV by Anthem Sports & Entertainment, the channel began airing sports and sports entertainment programming, including live/tape-delayed matches and compilations, professional wrestling from Impact Wrestling, mixed martial arts from the UFC, and rugby league featuring all 2017 season matches from the Toronto Wolfpack. A high definition feed launched in March 2017. 

On March 9, 2018, the CRTC approved a previously unannounced sale of the channel from Anthem to Remuda Media, a newly established broadcasting company. Shareholders in Remuda Media previously was granted approval from the CRTC to launch The Country Channel, noted at the time as a "service that would offer programming aligned to the interests and needs of rural Canadians." In its application, it was noted that Remuda Media was unsuccessful at launching The Country Channel, and turned its eye to acquiring an existing channel, of which GameTV would be used to launch the service, or one similar. However, in July 2018, Anthem Media sent a letter to the CRTC stating that the proposed transfer in ownership from Anthem to Remuda was terminated, and Anthem would retain ownership of GameTV.

On April 1, 2019, FNTSY Sports Network was quietly replaced in Canada by a newly-launched sister channel, Game+. In August 2020, the channel introduced a new weekend block featuring music programming from new sister network AXS TV. In 2020, it premiered an original documentary series, The Search for Canada's Game Shows, which chronicles the history of Canadian entries into the genre.

See also
 Game Show Network, a U.S. equivalent carried by most Canadian television providers.

References

External links

Digital cable television networks in Canada
Television channels and stations established in 2005
English-language television stations in Canada
Anthem Sports & Entertainment
Game shows